Norb may refer to:
Norb abbreviation of the name Norbert
 Norb (comic), a newspaper comic strip that began in 1989
 Norb, a character in the anime series Eureka Seven

Norb, A person that values athleticism at the expense of happiness